"Omphalos" is a science fantasy short story by Ted Chiang. It is named after the Omphalos hypothesis and a 1857 book by English naturalist Philip Henry Gosse. It was first published in Chiang's 2019 collection Exhalation: Stories.

Plot

The story is told through the prayers and letters of pious archaeologist Dr. Dorothea Morrel, and takes place in an alternate 20th century where young Earth creationism is true.

Dorothea travels from an archaeological dig in Arisona to give a public lecture on Chicagou, where she explains how dendrochronology has determined the world to be 8912 years old, as well as indicating that the first trees were created fully grown, as they have a ringless core. The museum's latest exhibit includes Atacaman mummies, belonging to the first generation of humans—created as adults by God and thus lacking navels. Believing that primordial beings with apparent signs of growth would have been tantamount to deception, Dorothea is passionate that God intended humans to understand Him through science.

From a meeting with her cousin, Dorothea believes that an illegal sale of museum relics is taking place. The clues lead her to a post office at San Francisco, where to her surprise the thief turns out to be a teen, Wilhelmina McCullough. She is the daughter of Dr. Nathan McCullough, director of the University of Alta California. Wilhelmina explains that she did not steal out of personal gain, but to strengthen people's faith before her father's recent discovery is made public.

Dr. McCullough is an astronomer who challenges the consensus that the Sun is the only star at absolute rest. Not only does his research indicate that the Solar System moves like any other star, but that in defiance of celestial mechanics, the star 58 Eridani circles a seemingly empty spot every 24 hours, whose center is at absolute rest relative to the luminiferous aether. He reasons that God is miraculously sustaining a geocentric star system around a truly unmoving planet whose inhabitants constitute His true reason for creating the universe. Suspecting that humanity is simply a test or an unintended side-effect, he fears that humanity is not part of a divine plan and that suffering (including his son's death) is meaningless.

Disturbed, Dorothea tells her cousin that she is taking a leave now that she finds her job meaningless. Weeks later however, Dorothea plans to resume her work, realizing that doing science for its own sake is just as fulfilling—regardless of God's plan.

Reception

"Omphalos" won the Locus Award for Best Novelette for 2020. It was also a finalist for the 2020 Hugo Award for Best Novelette and the Theodore Sturgeon Award.

The Nation considered the basic premise—a creationist archaeologist in conflict with a creationist astronomer—to be "hilarious", but noted that the story is not a humorous work, and emphasized that Dorothea is an empiricist who uses the scientific method.

In The Washington Post, Paul Di Filippo called the story "masterful and striking", and found it evocative of Philip Jose Farmer's  "Sail On! Sail On!".

Notes

References

Short stories by Ted Chiang
2019 short stories
American short stories
Novels about religion